The Jogja-NETPAC Asian Film Festival (JAFF) is an annual film festival held in Yogyakarta, Indonesia. The festival has partnered with the Network for the Promotion of Asian Cinema since its inaugural edition in 2006. It aims to introduce Asian cinema to a wider audience and provides a space for arts, culture and tourism.

The 17th Jogja-NETPAC Asian Film Festival was held from 26 November to 3 December 2022.

History
Several Indonesian filmmakers, Garin Nugroho, Ifa Isfansyah, Budi Irawanto, Yosep Anggi Noen, Ajish Dibyo, Dyna Herlina and Ismail Basbeth along with NETPAC curator Philip Cheah, initiated the festival.

The first edition of the festival was held from 7 to 12 August 2006, about three months after the 2006 Yogyakarta earthquake. Kompas noted that the inaugural edition marked the recovery of Yogyakarta post-earthquake. Meanwhile, Eric Sasono of Tempo noted that the festival created a new film market to develop the Asian cinema even further.

Programs
As of 2022, the Jogja-NETPAC Asian Film Festival is organized in various sections:
Main Competition: feature films compete for Hanoman Awards and NETPAC Award, the most prestigious awards of the festival.
Light of Asia: short films compete for Blencong Award, screened in compilations
Indonesian Screen Awards: Indonesian feature films compete for five categories.
Panorama: selection of feature films screened during the international film festivals previously.
Asian Perspectives: encapsulates feature films which showcase different Asian perspectives.
Indonesian Film Showcase: showcases Indonesian feature films out of competition.
Classic: revisiting the history by showcasing films by certain notable directors
Emerging: presentation of films by directors whose work shown at JAFF for the first time
JAFF-Series: showcases series
Community Screen: screenings and discussions with several film communities
Whisper Cinema: film screenings where blind and visually impaired people are guided by volunteers that verbally describe a film sequence.
JFA Showcase: showcases the work of the Jogja Film Academy students.

Awards
The most prestigious award given at JAFF is the Golden Hanoman Award for best film. As of 2022, the festival has presented the following awards:
Competition
Golden Hanoman Award – best film

Silver Hanoman Award – runner-up of best film
NETPAC Award – rewards to best first or second feature of Asian directors, chosen by Network for the Promotion of Asian Cinema
Geber Award – rewards to best first or second feature of Asian directors, chosen by film communities around Indonesia
Indonesian Screen Awards – rewards to best work on Indonesian feature films
Best Film
Best Director
Best Storytelling
Best Cinematography
Best Performance
Shorts
Blencong Award – best short film
Student Award – best short film, chosen by representatives of film students in Yogyakarta

References

Awards established in 2006
Recurring events established in 2006
2006 establishments in Indonesia
Annual events in Indonesia
Film festivals in Indonesia